Dariusz Adamczyk (born 1966 in Poland) is a Polish-German historian.

Adamczyk studied history, political science, sociology and social psychology at the University of Silesia in Katowice and Leibniz University Hannover, where he gained a PhD defending a thesis called Zur Stellung Polens im modernen Weltsystem der frühen Neuzeit ("On Poland's position in the modern world system of the early modern age"). Between 2000 and 2008, Adamczyk was a lecturer in Eastern European History at the History Department of Leibniz University Hannover, before holding a junior professorship in Eastern European History at the same institution until July 2010. Since September 2010, he has been a research fellow at the German Historical Institute Warsaw, where he is researching the Piast dynasty in the European context. He has also worked on the history of Eastern and East-Central Europe, relations between the Islamic world and Europe in the Middle Ages, and the history of trade and money. Since 2010, Adamczyk has been the editor of Hans-Heinrich Nolte's Zeitschrift für Weltgeschichte ("World History Magazine").

Selected publications 
 Zur Stellung Polens im modernen Weltsystem der frühen Neuzeit ("On Poland's position in the modern world system of the Early Modern Age"), Verlag Dr. Kovac, Hamburg 2001 (originally Hannover University thesis, 1999). 
 Silberströme und die Einbeziehung Osteuropas in das islamische Handelssystem, ("Stream of silver: Eastern Europe's involvement in the Islamic trading system") in Carl-Hans Hauptmeyer et al. (Hg.): Die Welt querdenken. Verlag Peter Lang, Frankfurt am Main 2003, pp. 107–123. 
 Friesen, Wikinger, Araber. Die Ostseewelt zwischen Dorestad und Samarkand, ca. 700-1100, ("Frisians, Vikings, Arabs: the Baltic world, from Dorestad to Samarkand, ca. 700-1100") in Andrea Komlosy, Hans-Heinrich Nolte, Imbi Sooman (Hg.): Ostsee 700-2000. Gesellschaft – Wirtschaft – Kultur. Promedia Verlag, Vienna 2007, pp. 32–48. 
 (Editor and co-author) Quo vadis Asien? China, Indien, Russland, Mittlerer Osten und Zentralasien im globalen Kontext. ("Status quo for Asia? China, India, Russia, the Middle East and Central Asia in the global context"), Wochenschau Verlag, Schwalbach/Ts. 2009.

Links 
 Author page in the catalogue of the German National Library
 Employee page at the German Historical Institute Warsaw, with full list of publications

Academic staff of the University of Hanover
1966 births
21st-century Polish historians
Polish male non-fiction writers
Living people